Leslie Alexander may refer to:

Leslie Alexander (businessman) (born 1944), former stock trader, owner of the Houston Rockets
Leslie Alexander (rabbi), American rabbi
Leslie Alexander (actress) (born 1957), American actress
Leslie M. Alexander (born 1948), American diplomat

See also

Alexander Leslie (disambiguation)